Rabbi Haim Bitan is a Tunisian rabbi. He currently serves as the chief rabbi of Tunisia and of Djerba.

He also serves on the Presidium Council of the Alliance of Rabbis in Islamic States.

References 

20th-century Tunisian rabbis
Year of birth missing (living people)
Living people
21st-century Tunisian rabbis